Watchung is a borough in Somerset County, in the U.S. state of New Jersey, located approximately  west of New York City. As of the 2020 United States census, the borough's population was 6,449, an increase of 648 (+11.2%) from the 2010 census count of 5,801, which in turn reflected an increase of 188 (+3.3%) from the 5,613 counted in the 2000 census. It is located within the Raritan Valley region.

Watchung was incorporated as a borough by an act of the New Jersey Legislature on May 23, 1926, from portions of North Plainfield Township (now Green Brook Township) based on the results of a referendum held on April 20, 1926. The name "Watchung" comes from the Lenni Lenape Native Americans, meaning "high hills" or from "watschu," meaning "hill."

In 2012, Forbes.com listed Watchung as 384th in its listing of "America's Most Expensive ZIP Codes", with a median home price of $767,507.

The borough is one of the state's highest-income communities. Based on data from the American Community Survey (ACS) for 2014–2018, Watchung residents had a median household income of $153,341, almost double the statewide median of $79,363.

History
George Washington surveyed the British troops in Perth Amboy, 20 miles away, from the first ridge of the Watchung Mountains. The eastern edge of these ridges reaches to the Oranges in the direction of Newark. The name "Washingtonville" was used in early times, but was rejected as the name for the area by the United States Postal Service, which felt that the state already had too many places named Washington.

Watchung, in the 1900s was a semi-rural small community of about 3,200 people in comparison with the relatively larger and more urban communities of Plainfield and Somerville. The first mayor of the town was Henry Baldwin Macdonald, who served from 1926 to 1928. The 1967 Plainfield riots, caused an exodus of the large upper-middle class population from the nearby cities to the Watchung Hills area to communities such as Watchung, Warren Township and Bridgewater Township.

Watchung was incorporated as a borough by an act of the New Jersey Legislature on May 23, 1926, from portions of North Plainfield Township (now Green Brook Township) based on the results of a referendum held on April 20, 1926.

In the wake of public fear that ensued after the 1938 radio broadcast of Orson Welles' The War of the Worlds, National Guard troops were stationed around the hills in Watchung, as told on the vinyl record recording of news reports of the day.

Notable figures who have lived in Watchung include Bobby Thomson, Billy Ard and Carl Banks.

Historic places
Eaton House is a Watchung historic site that was owned by congressman Charles Aubrey Eaton and has been the residence of other notables over the years.  Known also as the Sunbright Farm farmhouse, the home was damaged in April 2014 when it was hit by trees that fell as a result of a likely microburst in a severe storm that rolled through the area.

The borough is home to Watchung Valley Golf Club, which moved from its original nine-hole course in North Plainfield to its current location on Mountain Boulevard in 1927. The club was known as the Twin Brooks Country Club from 1933 to 2017, when it re-adopted its name as Watchung Valley Country Club, which was in use from 1928 to 1933.

Geography
According to the United States Census Bureau, the borough had a total area of 6.04 square miles (15.65 km2), including 6.02 square miles (15.58 km2) of land and 0.03 square miles (0.07 km2) of water (0.46%).

Unincorporated communities, localities and place names located partially or completely within the borough include Washingtonville.

The borough borders Green Brook Township, North Plainfield and Warren Township in Somerset County; and Berkeley Heights, Plainfield, and Scotch Plains in Union County.

The Stony Brook flows through Watchung borough, making its way from Warren Township to the Watchung Lake, then through the gorge in the first Watchung mountain and over the Wetumpka Falls, on its way to the Green Brook.

The borough is roughly a 40-minute drive from New York City and a 20-minute drive from Newark.

Demographics

2010 census

The Census Bureau's 2006–2010 American Community Survey showed that (in 2010 inflation-adjusted dollars) median household income was $112,917 (with a margin of error of +/− $21,189) and the median family income was $144,883 (+/− $38,172). Males had a median income of $92,667 (+/− $15,969) versus $63,811 (+/− $15,306) for females. The per capita income for the borough was $59,177 (+/− $6,617). About 3.2% of families and 2.0% of the population were below the poverty line, including 1.2% of those under age 18 and none of those age 65 or over.

2000 census
As of the 2000 United States census there were 5,613 people, 2,098 households, and 1,617 families residing in the borough. The population density was 933.0 people per square mile (360.0/km2). There were 2,155 housing units at an average density of 358.2 per square mile (138.2/km2). The racial makeup of the borough was 84.30% White, 3.37% African American, 0.09% Native American, 9.85% Asian, 0.09% Pacific Islander, 0.71% from other races, and 1.59% from two or more races. Hispanic or Latino of any race were 2.99% of the population.

There were 2,098 households, out of which 30.8% had children under the age of 18 living with them, 70.4% were married couples living together, 4.1% had a female householder with no husband present, and 22.9% were non-families. 19.0% of all households were made up of individuals, and 6.9% had someone living alone who was 65 years of age or older. The average household size was 2.62 and the average family size was 3.00.

In the borough the population was spread out, with 21.9% under the age of 18, 4.7% from 18 to 24, 27.0% from 25 to 44, 30.1% from 45 to 64, and 16.3% who were 65 years of age or older. The median age was 43 years. For every 100 females, there were 95.4 males. For every 100 females age 18 and over, there were 93.3 males.

The median income for a household in the borough was $101,944, and the median income for a family was $120,764. Males had a median income of $80,658 versus $54,167 for females. The per capita income for the borough was $58,653. About 0.5% of families and 2.2% of the population were below the poverty line, including 1.6% of those under age 18 and 1.6% of those age 65 or over.

Government

Local government
Watchung is governed under the Borough form of New Jersey municipal government, which is used in 218 municipalities (of the 564) statewide, making it the most common form of government in New Jersey. The governing body is comprised of a Mayor and a Borough Council, with all positions elected at-large on a partisan basis as part of the November general election. A Mayor is elected directly by the voters to a four-year term of office. The Borough Council is comprised of six members elected to serve three-year terms on a staggered basis, with two seats coming up for election each year in a three-year cycle. The Borough form of government used by Watchung is a "weak mayor / strong council" government in which council members act as the legislative body with the mayor presiding at meetings and voting only in the event of a tie. The mayor can veto ordinances subject to an override by a two-thirds majority vote of the council. The mayor makes committee and liaison assignments for council members, and most appointments are made by the mayor with the advice and consent of the council.

, the Mayor of Watchung Borough is Democrat Keith S. Balla, whose term of office ends December 31, 2022. Members of the Watchung Borough Council are Ronald Jubin (R, 2023), Curt S. Dahl (R, 2024), Cristine B. Ead (R, 2024), Freddie Hayeck (R, 2023), Pietro "Pete" Martino (D, 2022) and Wendy Robinson (D, 2022).

In December 2019, the Borough Council selected Ronald Jubin to complete the term expiring in December 2020 that had been held by Robert L. Gibbs until he resigned from office the previous month.

Federal, state and county representation
Watchung is located in the 7th Congressional District and is part of New Jersey's 21st state legislative district.

 

Somerset County is governed by a five-member Board of County Commissioners, whose members are elected at-large to three-year terms of office on a staggered basis, with one or two seats coming up for election each year. At an annual reorganization meeting held on the first Friday of January, the board selects a Director and Deputy Director from among its members. , Somerset County's County Commissioners are
Director Shanel Robinson (D, Franklin Township, term as commissioner ends December 31, 2024; term as director ends 2022),
Deputy Director Melonie Marano (D, Green Brook Township, term as commissioner and as deputy director ends 2022),
Paul Drake (D, Hillsborough Township, 2023),
Douglas Singleterry (D, North Plainfield, 2023) and 
Sara Sooy (D, Basking Ridge in Bernards Township, 2024).
Pursuant to Article VII Section II of the New Jersey State Constitution, each county in New Jersey is required to have three elected administrative officials known as constitutional officers. These officers are the County Clerk and County Surrogate (both elected for five-year terms of office) and the County Sheriff (elected for a three-year term). Constitutional officers, elected on a countywide basis are 
County Clerk Steve Peter (D, Somerville, 2022),
Sheriff Darrin Russo (D, Franklin Township, 2022) and 
Surrogate Bernice "Tina" Jalloh (D, Franklin Township, 2025)

The ZIP Code 07069 for Watchung was established effective July 2000. Previously, the borough had been served by the Plainfield post office as ZIP Code 07060.

Politics
As of March 2011, there were a total of 4,154 registered voters in Watchung, of which 845 (20.3% vs. 26.0% countywide) were registered as Democrats, 1,483 (35.7% vs. 25.7%) were registered as Republicans and 1,823 (43.9% vs. 48.2%) were registered as Unaffiliated. There were 3 voters registered as Libertarians or Greens. Among the borough's 2010 Census population, 71.6% (vs. 60.4% in Somerset County) were registered to vote, including 93.3% of those ages 18 and over (vs. 80.4% countywide).

In the 2016 presidential election, Democrat Hillary Clinton received 48.6% of the vote (1,551 cast), ahead of Republican Donald Trump who received 47.7% of the vote (1,523 votes), and other candidates with 3.7% (117 votes). 3,191 votes were cast in total. In the 2012 presidential election, Republican Mitt Romney received 57.9% of the vote (1,687 cast), ahead of Democrat Barack Obama with 41.1% (1,198 votes), and other candidates with 0.9% (27 votes), among the 2,931 ballots cast by the borough's 4,396 registered voters (19 ballots were spoiled), for a turnout of 66.7%. In the 2008 presidential election, Republican John McCain received 1,803 votes (55.0% vs. 46.1% countywide), ahead of Democrat Barack Obama with 1,415 votes (43.2% vs. 52.1%) and other candidates with 29 votes (0.9% vs. 1.1%), among the 3,277 ballots cast by the borough's 4,070 registered voters, for a turnout of 80.5% (vs. 78.7% in Somerset County). In the 2004 presidential election, Republican George W. Bush received 1,865 votes (54.5% vs. 51.5% countywide), ahead of Democrat John Kerry with 1,516 votes (44.3% vs. 47.2%) and other candidates with 30 votes (0.9% vs. 0.9%), among the 3,424 ballots cast by the borough's 3,795 registered voters, for a turnout of 90.2% (vs. 81.7% in the whole county).

In the 2013 gubernatorial election, Republican Chris Christie received 72.8% of the vote (1,335 cast), ahead of Democrat Barbara Buono with 25.4% (466 votes), and other candidates with 1.7% (32 votes), among the 1,861 ballots cast by the borough's 4,396 registered voters (28 ballots were spoiled), for a turnout of 42.3%. In the 2009 gubernatorial election, Republican Chris Christie received 1,428 votes (60.6% vs. 55.8% countywide), ahead of Democrat Jon Corzine with 720 votes (30.5% vs. 34.1%), Independent Chris Daggett with 178 votes (7.6% vs. 8.7%) and other candidates with 15 votes (0.6% vs. 0.7%), among the 2,357 ballots cast by the borough's 4,155 registered voters, yielding a 56.7% turnout (vs. 52.5% in the county).

Education
Students in public school for pre-kindergarten through eighth grade are educated in the Watchung Borough Schools. As of the 2019–20 school year, the district, comprised of two schools, had an enrollment of 604 students and 66.6 classroom teachers (on an FTE basis), for a student–teacher ratio of 9.1:1. Schools in the district (with 2019–20 enrollment data from the National Center for Education Statistics) are 
Bayberry Elementary School with 326 students in grades Pre-K–4 and 
Valley View School with 271 students in grades 5–8.

Watchung's students in public school for ninth through twelfth grades attend Watchung Hills Regional High School in Warren Township together with students from the neighboring communities of Green Brook Township and Warren Township (in Somerset County) and Long Hill Township (in Morris County). As of the 2019–20 school year, the high school had an enrollment of 1,948 students and 160.6 classroom teachers (on an FTE basis), for a student–teacher ratio of 12.1:1. The district's board of education is comprised of nine members, who are elected directly by the voters to serve three-year terms of office on a staggered basis, with three seats up for each year. Of the nine elected seats, two are allocated to Watchung.

Christian denomination Mount St. Mary Academy (9–12), which opened in 1908, is operated by the Sisters of Mercy under the supervision of Roman Catholic Diocese of Metuchen.

Transportation

Roads and highways

U.S. Route 22 passes briefly through the borough's southeast corner, entering from North Plainfield in the west and continuing into Scotch Plains Township in Union County.

Public transportation
NJ Transit provides service on the 95 bus route between Watchung and Newark.

Notable people

People who were born in, residents of, or otherwise closely associated with Watchung include:

 Billy Ard (born 1959), former New York Giants football player
 Carl Banks (born 1962), former New York Giants football player
 Anne Casale (1930–2002, class of 1948), cookbook author and cooking teacher
 James Maxime DuPont (1912–1991), collector of meteorites
 Chaka Khan (born 1953), Grammy Award-winning singer-songwriter
 Stephen Kovacs (1972–2022), saber fencer and fencing coach, charged with sexual assault, died in prison
 Harold Norman Moldenke (1909–1996), botanist and taxonomist
 David Palmer, vocalist and songwriter, best known as a former member of Steely Dan and as the lyricist of the Carole King number two hit, "Jazzman"
 Laura Prepon (born 1980), actress who played the character of Donna Pinciotti on That '70s Show
 Bjarne Stroustrup (born 1950), inventor of the C++ programming language
 Bobby Thomson (1923–2010), former professional baseball player for the New York Giants, who hit the famous Shot Heard 'Round the World to win the 1951 NL pennant
 Anthony Volpe (born 2000), professional baseball shortstop in the New York Yankees organization
 Katt Williams (born 1973), comedian, actor and rapper
 H. Boyd Woodruff (1917–2017), soil microbiologist who discovered actinomycin and developed industrial production by fermentation of many natural products, including cyanocobalamin (a synthetic form of Vitamin B12), the avermectins and other important antibiotics
 Adella Wotherspoon (1903–2004), youngest and longest-lived survivor of the General Slocum, a steamship that sank in the East River killing over 1,000 in 1904  Her ashes are buried beside her husband's at Wilson Memorial Union Church Cemetery in Watchung.

References

External links

 
 Watchung Borough Schools
 
 School Data for the Watchung Borough Schools, National Center for Education Statistics
 Watchung Hills Regional High School website
 Watchung Boy Scouts website
 Watchung Girl Scouts website

 
1926 establishments in New Jersey
Borough form of New Jersey government
Boroughs in Somerset County, New Jersey
Populated places established in 1926